Lickdale, previously known as Union Forge, is an unincorporated community in northern Lebanon County, Pennsylvania, United States. It is a village approximately three miles west of Fredericksburg, Pennsylvania (formerly Stumpstown), and was named for James Lick. Lickdale was a prominent 19th century canal port along a branch of the Union Canal and contained a large commercial ice house. It is on the Swatara Creek and serves as a southern gateway to Swatara State Park. It is located in Union Township and Route 72 has an interchange with Interstate 81 via Fisher Avenue. It is served by the Jonestown post office with the zip code of 17038.

References

Unincorporated communities in Lebanon County, Pennsylvania
Unincorporated communities in Pennsylvania